Jaan Poska VR III/1 (Laiusevälja, Kreis Dorpat, Governorate of Livonia – 7 March 1920, Tallinn, Estonia) was an Estonian barrister and politician.

Early life 

Poska was born the fifth of 12 children of a Russian Orthodox parish schoolmaster and received his secondary education at the Orthodox church's school in Riga. He entered medical school at the University of Tartu, but soon transferred to law where he graduated in 1890. Poska was the first ethnic Estonian admitted to the bar in Tallinn where he worked as barrister.

Career 

Jaan Poska was mayor of Tallinn during 1913–1917. In that position he supported reforms, like reforming healthcare and founding two schools. In April 1917, he became governor of the Autonomous Governorate of Estonia.  1917 the Maapäev refused to recognize the new Bolshevik rule and proclaimed itself the supreme legal authority of Estonia. The Republic of Estonia formally declared independence on 24 February 1918, only to be occupied by the German Empire until the end of World War I. Estonian war of independence against Baltic German and Russian forces lasted from 1918 to 1920.

On 24 February 1918, Poska was appointed the Minister of Foreign Affairs of Estonia. He worked in Western Europe for gaining diplomatic recognition to Estonia and participated in Paris Peace Conference. He led the peace talks with Soviet Russia and achieved Treaty of Tartu which was signed on 2 February 1920, and helped draft the first Estonian constitution.

When Poska died suddenly on 7 March 1920 at the early age of 54. 20,000 Estonians attended his funeral.

See also 
Estonian War of Independence
Paris Peace Conference (1919–1920)
Treaty of Tartu (Russian–Estonian)

Citations

 Ülo Kaevats et al. 2000. Eesti Entsüklopeedia 14. Tallinn: Eesti Entsüklopeediakirjastus,

Cited sources

External links 

Tartu rahu sepistaja Jaan Poska väärib monumenti (Estonian)
Livland. Estland. Kurland. Œsel.
On 28 November 1917, the Estonian Diet (the Maapäev) declared itself fee supreme power in Estonia.
On 28 November 1917, the Land council proclaimed itself the highest power in Estonia...
On This Day - 28 November 1917
Though the popularly elected Provisional National Council, had proclaimed itself the highest authority in Estonia as early as 28 November 1917...

1866 births
1920 deaths
People from Jõgeva Parish
People from Kreis Dorpat
Eastern Orthodox Christians from Estonia
Estonian People's Party politicians
Rulers of Estonia
Ministers of Foreign Affairs of Estonia
Russian Constituent Assembly members
Members of the Estonian Constituent Assembly
Mayors of Tallinn
Estonian diplomats
Estonian anti-communists
19th-century Estonian lawyers
University of Tartu alumni
20th-century Estonian politicians
20th-century Estonian lawyers